{{infobox person
| name               = John Hanke
| image              = John Hanke by Gage Skidmore.jpg
| alt                = 
| caption            = Hanke at the 2016 San Diego Comic-Con International
| birth_date         = 
| birth_place        = 
| alma_mater         = University of California, BerkeleyUniversity of Texas at Austin
| occupation         = Businessman and entrepreneur
| known              = Keyhole, Inc., Google Earth, Niantic, Inc., Pokémon Go}}

John Hanke (born 1967) is an American technology executive.
Hanke led Google's Geo product division, which includes Google Earth, Google Maps, StreetView, SketchUp, and Panoramio.
He is founder and CEO of Niantic, Inc., a software company spun out of Google and the creator of Pokémon Go. 

 Early life and startups 
Born in 1967, Hanke was raised in the small central Texas town of Cross Plains and graduated from Cross Plains High School in 1985. He attended the University of Texas, Austin and graduated with a bachelor's degree in 1989.

In his first post-college role, he spent four years with the United States Foreign Service in Washington, DC, and overseas in Myanmar working on foreign policy issues.

He moved across the country to attend the Haas School of Business at the University of California, Berkeley. He joined Steve Sellers and his video game design startup Archetype Interactive, which was developing Meridian 59, one of the first commercial massively multiplayer online role-playing games (MMORPG). They sold the firm to The 3DO Company on the day he graduated from Berkeley with an MBA. Hanke and Sellers created another entertainment startup, The Big Network, which was acquired in 2000 by eUniverse for $17.1 million.

 Keyhole 
Hanke became the co-founder and CEO of geospatial data visualization firm Keyhole in 2001. Early funding was provided by the corporate venture group within Sony, the CIA's venture capital firm In-Q-Tel, and the technology company NVIDIA. The startup was able to garner significant attention from its mapping technology use early in the Iraq War. Keyhole's mapping technology was also noted by Google co-founder Sergey Brin, and Google acquired Keyhole in 2004 in a deal worth $35 million in stock. 

 Google 
Hanke joined Google as a part of Keyhole's acquisition, and he became the vice president of product management for Google's Geo division. During this period, he oversaw the transformation of Keyhole's technology into Google Earth and Google Maps in 2005. He also negotiated an agreement with Apple to include Google Maps on the iPhone. Other products followed, including StreetView, SketchUp, and Panoramio. His team would later found Niantic.

 Niantic 
In 2010, Hanke was given resources to staff an augmented reality gaming unit within Google and the new internal startup was dubbed Niantic Labs. Returning to his gaming roots, the company crafted an augmented reality location-based multiplayer game called Ingress. The game had a million players within a year of its 2013 release, and seven million by 2015.

Hanke led Niantic's split from Google in late 2015 and raised $30 million from Google, Nintendo and Pokémon. He stayed as the company's CEO and guided the firm through the release of Pokémon Go'' in July 2016, which generated over $4.2 billion in revenue.

References

Further reading

External links 
 Interview at Where 2.0 2005
 Why 'Pokémon Go' is Such a phenomenon - Business Insider, July 2016

1967 births
American technology chief executives
Businesspeople from the San Francisco Bay Area
Google employees
Haas School of Business alumni
Living people
University of Texas at Austin alumni